Sara Hagström  (born 25 March 1995) is a Swedish orienteering competitor. She was born in Skövde.

She won individual gold medals at the Junior World Orienteering Championships in 2014 and 2015, and was part of the Swedish team that won the relay in 2014 and 2015. She competed at the 2016 World Orienteering Championships, and won a bronze medal in the relay at the 2018 European Orienteering Championships. She placed sixth in the middle distance at the 2018 World Orienteering Championships in Latvia.

Her sister Johanna Hagström is a cross-country skier.

References

External links
profile at svenskorientering.se

Swedish orienteers
Female orienteers
Foot orienteers
1995 births
Living people
People from Skövde Municipality
Sportspeople from Västra Götaland County
Junior World Orienteering Championships medalists